Northern Lights is a 2006 comedy-drama broadcast on ITV starring Mark Benton and Robson Green. It is a spin-off of the 2004 Christmas special Christmas Lights.

A sequel, City Lights, was broadcast in 2007. Also a Christmas special, Clash of the Santas, was broadcast in December 2008. It featured Colin and Howie taking a trip to Lithuania to represent the United Kingdom in a Santa convention. The main problem with this is that miserable Howie is picked as Santa, while true Christmas believer Colin is relegated to the role of cheerleading elf.

Cast 

 Robson Green as Colin: Colin Armstrong is a cheeky-chappy. Colin's life revolves around spending time with his family and hanging around with his friends in the pub. Colin's best friend is Howard, while he respects Howard greatly, he has the tendency to get jealous over his successes. Very happily married, he and Jackie have three children, Brooke, Liam and Leyton.
 Mark Benton as Howie: Howard Scott is friendly and patient – a 'gentle giant' who has always been there to support the people he is close to. He and Colin share the same juvenile sense of humour and competitive nature. Howie is less self-confident than Colin, but is capable of defending himself when he needs to. Recently promoted to management at work, he's keen to better himself and provide the luxuries of life for his wife Pauline and baby daughter Victoria.
 Nicola Stephenson as Jackie: Jackie Armstrong is caring, dependable and intelligent. She loves Colin deeply, yet does not always approve of his devil-may-care approach to life. Jackie is very close to her sister Pauline and they enjoy living next door to each other and combining their family's lives. When Colin and Howie are feuding this can lead to the sisters' diplomatic skills being stretched to extremes, but the girls always stay united despite their husbands' antics.
 Sian Reeves as Pauline: Pauline Scott is shy compared to her sister and has a traditional outlook on life. She is fiercely protective of her family. She is torn between enjoying the perks that Howie's salary now allows and being unsettled by the changes it also brings. She gave birth to baby Victoria 18 months ago and as the series starts is on a quest to get her and Howie's sex life back on track.
 Linzey Cocker as Brooke: Brooke Armstrong is the eldest of the three children and is the only daughter, she soon gets a boyfriend, but tries to hide it from her mum, Brooke is like a mother to her brothers, 
 Keith Clifford as Eric: Eric Foulkes is the father to Jackie and Pauline, and he has recently retired as foreman at Sherpa Freight where his sons-in-law still work and is fondly remembered by staff. He now splits his time between babysitting for the two families and his allotment.
 James Midgley as Nigel: Nigel Cockburn, Colin's arch-enemy, is stern, arrogant and highly passionate on climbing the career ladder at Sherpa Freight. 
 Russell Dixon as Len: "Old-school", Len Guthrie is often the voice of reason to counter Cockburn's management style. Respectful of his hard working staff, he is a champion of both Howie and Colin over the course of the series.

Episodes

External links

Review of Clash of the Santas, Leicester Mercury

2000s British comedy-drama television series
2006 British television series debuts
2008 British television series endings
British comedy-drama television shows
ITV television dramas
Television shows set in Manchester
English-language television shows